Pavlo Pavlovych Pokhytaylo (born 24 December 1995) is a Ukrainian professional footballer who plays as a left midfielder for Ukrainian club Kramatorsk.

References

External links
 
 
 

1995 births
Living people
People from Kharkiv Oblast
Ukrainian footballers
Association football midfielders
FC Solli Plyus Kharkiv players
SC Kakhovka players
FC Yarud Mariupol players
FC Tavriya Novotroitske players
FC Trostianets players
FC Nikopol players
FC Kramatorsk players
Ukrainian First League players
Ukrainian Second League players
Ukrainian Amateur Football Championship players
Ukrainian expatriate footballers
Expatriate footballers in Poland
Ukrainian expatriate sportspeople in Poland
Sportspeople from Kharkiv Oblast